Saint Joseph High School (commonly referred to as St. Joe) is a Roman Catholic college preparatory high school located in South Bend, Indiana. Formerly located adjacent to the campuses of the University of Notre Dame, St. Mary's College, and Holy Cross College, in 2012, the school moved to a new location about a mile south of Notre Dame. It is located within the Diocese of Fort Wayne–South Bend.

History 
Saint Joseph's High School began classes on September 20, 1953, as the first consolidated, co-institutional Catholic high school in the South Bend area. The school was made up of students from Central Catholic High School, Saint Hedwig School, Saint Joseph's Academy, and South Bend Catholic High School.

From 1953 to 1968, Saint Joseph's High School had separate divisions for boys and girls. The faculty consisted primarily of Sisters of the Holy Cross and Brothers of Holy Cross. In 1968 the school became coeducational.

In 2012, St. Joseph's constructed a new building on the site formerly occupied by Saint Joseph Regional Medical Center. Along with the new building, the official name of the school was changed from Saint Joseph's High School to Saint Joseph High School.

Academics 
SJHS is accredited by the Indiana Department of Education and the North Central Association of Colleges and Schools and is also a member of the National Catholic Education Association.

17 different AP classes are offered. St Joe has been named a Blue Ribbon school by the United States Department of Education.

AP classes offered include AP Biology, AP Calculus AB, AP Calculus BC, AP Chemistry, AP Computer Science A, AP English Language and Composition, AP Environmental Science, AP Latin, AP Macroeconomics, AP Microeconomics, AP Physics C, AP Spanish, AP Statistics, AP United States Government and Politics, AP United States History.

SJHS was named one of the Top 50 Catholic High Schools in the Catholic High School Honor Roll every year from 2006–2013.

Academic teams
Euro Challenge
Fed Challenge
National Champions in 2010
Quiz Bowl
Traditional State Champions in 2013, Rotary State Champions in 2013, 2014, 2015

Athletics
The Saint Joseph Indians are a member of the Northern Indiana Conference. Fellow member Mishawaka Marian is Saint Joe's archrival; the Indians and the Knights battle annually for the Bishop's Trophy. Sports offered are:

Baseball 
State Champions in 2017
Basketball (Boys) 
Basketball (Girls) 
State Champions in 2005, 2017
Cheerleading 
Cross Country (Boys) 
Cross Country (Girls) 
Danceline 
Football 
State Champions in 1995
Top-ranked in the state in 1964, prior to an official state championship.
Golf (Boys) 
Golf (Girls) 
Hockey 
State Champions in 1988, 1989
Lacrosse (Boys) 
Lacrosse (Girls) 
Soccer (Boys) 
State Champions in 2003
Soccer (Girls) 
State Champions in 1998, 2010
Softball 
 State Champions in 2022
Swimming (Boys) 
Swimming (Girls) 
Tennis (Boys) 
Tennis (Girls) 
Team State Champions in 1975 (3-way tie), 2010
Track (Boys) 
Track (Girls) 
Volleyball 
State Champions in 1972
Wrestling

Notable alumni
Tom Abernethy, National Basketball Association (NBA) basketball player 
Paul Appleby, singer
Brendan Bayliss, singer/guitarist of the band Umphrey's McGee
Pete Buttigieg, United States Secretary of Transportation, mayor of South Bend, Indiana, 2020 presidential candidate
Nathan Gunn, Award-winning baritone opera singer
Traci Paige Johnson, animator and television producer, creator of Blue's Clues
Joe Kernan, former governor of Indiana, former mayor of South Bend, Indiana
James Mueller, mayor of South Bend, Indiana
John Laskowski, Indiana University basketball broadcaster, former NBA Player and member of IU's national championship team
Mike McNeill, former NHL hockey player
Steve Ontiveros, former MLB pitcher; 1994 All Star with Oakland Athletics; American League ERA Leader 1994
Clarissa Pinkola Estés, poet, post-trauma specialist, and Jungian psychoanalyst
Mike Schmuhl, political campaign manager

See also 
 List of high schools in Indiana

References

External links 
 

Educational institutions established in 1953
Education in South Bend, Indiana
Roman Catholic Diocese of Fort Wayne–South Bend
Catholic secondary schools in Indiana
Private high schools in Indiana
Schools in St. Joseph County, Indiana
1953 establishments in Indiana